Patriarch Constantine of Constantinople may refer to:

 Constantine I of Constantinople, Ecumenical Patriarch in 675–677
 Constantine II of Constantinople, Ecumenical Patriarch in 754–766
 Constantine III of Constantinople, Ecumenical Patriarch in 1059–1063
 Constantine IV of Constantinople, Ecumenical Patriarch in 1154–1156
 Constantine V of Constantinople, Ecumenical Patriarch in 1897–1901
 Constantine VI of Constantinople, Ecumenical Patriarch in 1924–1925